Surry County Courthouse Complex is a historic courthouse complex located at Surry, Surry County, Virginia.  The complex consists of the county courthouse, old clerk's office (1825–1826), VPI Extension office (c. 1907), the Commonwealth Attorney's office, the Commissioner of Revenue's office, a storage building, a Confederate memorial, and general district court building (c. 1840).  The county courthouse building was built in 1923, and is a two-story, seven bay, Classical Revival style brick building.  It features a hexastyle Ionic order portico that dominates its front facade.

It was listed on the National Register of Historic Places in 1986.

References

External links

County courthouses in Virginia
Courthouses on the National Register of Historic Places in Virginia
Neoclassical architecture in Virginia
Government buildings completed in 1923
National Register of Historic Places in Surry County, Virginia
Buildings and structures in Surry County, Virginia